Matthew P. Donovan (born 1958) is a United States Air Force veteran and government official who served as the United States Under Secretary of Defense for Personnel and Readiness from March 23, 2020 to January 20, 2021.  He also served as United States Under Secretary of the Air Force from August 3, 2017 to March 23, 2020. He had simultaneously served as the Acting United States Secretary of the Air Force from June 1, 2019 to October 18, 2019. Donovan previously served as majority policy director for the United States Senate Committee on Armed Services. Donovan served 31 years in the U.S. Air Force, retiring as a colonel. His service included tours as commander of the U.S. Air Force Officer Training School and of the 95th Fighter Squadron.

Education
1981: Bachelor of Science in Technical Management, Regis University
1986: Squadron Officer School
1995: Master of Science in Management, Webster University
1997: Air Command and Staff College (distinguished graduate)
1998: Master of Airpower Art and Science, School of Advanced Air and Space Studies of Air University
1998: Master of Military Art and Science, School of Advanced Military Studies of United States Army Command and General Staff College

References

External links
Biography at U.S. Air Force

|-

|-

Living people
Regis University alumni
United States Air Force colonels
Webster University alumni
School of Advanced Air and Space Studies alumni
United States Army Command and General Staff College alumni
Trump administration personnel
United States Under Secretaries of the Air Force
1958 births